Prolific author of several series of mysteries as Monica Ferris, Mary Monica Pulver, Margaret Frazer, Ellen and Mary Kuhfeld. The latest in Monica Ferris' Needlecraft Mysteries, "Knit Your Own Murder", was published in 2016.

Bibliography
Monica Ferris
Crewel World - 1999
Framed in Lace - 1999
A Stitch in Time - 2000
Unraveled Sleeve - 2001
A Murderous Yarn - 2002
Hanging by a Thread - 2003
Cutwork - 2003
Crewel Yule - 2004
Embroidered Truths - 2005
Sins and Needles - 2006
Knitting Bones - 2007
Thai Die - 2008
Blackwork - 2009
Buttons and Bones - 2010
Threadbare - 2011
And Then You Dye - 2012
The Drowning Spool - 2014
Darned If You Do - 2015
Knit Your Own Murder - 2016
Patterns of Murder:Crewel World/Framed in Lace/A Stitch in Time 2005
Sew Far, So Good:Unraveled Sleeve/A Murderous Yarn/Hanging by a Thread 2009

Mary Monica Pulver

 Murder At The War - 1987
 The Unforgiving Minutes - 1988
 Ashes to Ashes - 1988
 Original Sin - 1991
 Show Stopper - 1992

Margaret of Shaftesbury

 The Chronicles of Deer Abbey - 2017

Ellen and Mary Kuhfeld

 Minnesota Vice -2017

References

Year of birth missing (living people)
Living people
20th-century American novelists
21st-century American novelists
American mystery writers
Women mystery writers
American women novelists
20th-century American women writers
21st-century American women writers